Watterson House is a Federal rowhouse, located at 224 2nd Street, Southeast, Washington, D.C., on Capitol Hill.
 
It was placed on the National Register of Historic Places on January 17, 1992.

It was named for George Watterston, a Librarian of Congress.
It was the headquarters of the Cato Institute from 1982 to 1993.
It is the headquarters of the National Indian Gaming Association.

See also
 National Register of Historic Places listings in the District of Columbia

References

External links 

Houses on the National Register of Historic Places in Washington, D.C.
Federal architecture in Washington, D.C.
Houses completed in 1802
Capitol Hill